The 12705 / 06 Guntur Junction – Secunderabad Junction Intercity Express is a Express train belonging to Indian Railways South Central Railway zone that runs between  and  in India.

Coaches 
The 12705 / 06 Guntur Junction – Secunderabad Junction Intercity Express has one AC Chair Car,  six Non AC chair car, 11 general unreserved & two SLR (seating with luggage rake) coaches . It does not carry a pantry car coach.

As is customary with most train services in India, coach composition may be amended at the discretion of Indian Railways depending on demand.

Service 

Routing 

Traction 
As the route is electrified, a   based WAP-7 electric locomotive pulls the train to its destination.

References

External links 
 12705 Intercity Express at India Rail Info
 12706 Intercity Express at India Rail Info

Intercity Express (Indian Railways) trains
Transport in Guntur
Rail transport in Andhra Pradesh
Rail transport in Telangana
Transport in Secunderabad